is a Japanese athlete specialising in the high hurdles. He represented his country at the 2017 World Championships without advancing from the first round. In addition, he won a bronze medal at the 2018 Asian Games.

His personal best in the 110 metres hurdles is 13.25 seconds (+1.1 m/s), former National record and the current second best record in Japan, set in Fukui in 2019.

International competitions

References

1994 births
Living people
Japanese male hurdlers
World Athletics Championships athletes for Japan
Sportspeople from Hiroshima Prefecture
Athletes (track and field) at the 2018 Asian Games
Asian Games bronze medalists for Japan
Asian Games medalists in athletics (track and field)
Medalists at the 2018 Asian Games
Athletes (track and field) at the 2020 Summer Olympics
Olympic athletes of Japan
20th-century Japanese people
21st-century Japanese people